Prunus venulosa is a putative species of Prunus. It was first found only in the Denison, Texas area, and it strongly resembles Prunus gracilis. It is suspected to be of hybrid origin, with its parents being P. gracilis and P. rivularis.

Description
A shrub 1-2m tall, it differs from P. gracilis in having larger leaves with coarser serrations, and in having glabrous pedicels.

References

venulosa
Hybrid prunus
Flora of the United States
Plants described in 1911